Tilly is a village of Wallonia and district of the municipality of Villers-la-Ville, located in the province of Walloon Brabant, Belgium. 

It had a population of 1,707 inhabitants on December 31, 2007.

Near the village lies a Gallo-Roman tumulus called the Tumulus of Tilly.

Transport 
 Tilly railway station

References 
 Official website 

Former municipalities of Walloon Brabant
Sub-municipalities of Villers-la-Ville